Upper Mesopotamia constitutes the uplands and great outwash plain of northwestern Iraq, northeastern Syria and southeastern Turkey, in the northern Middle East. Since the early Muslim conquests of the mid-7th century, the region has been known by the traditional Arabic name of al-Jazira ( "the island", also transliterated Djazirah, Djezirah, Jazirah) and the Syriac variant Gāzartā or Gozarto. The Euphrates and Tigris rivers transform Mesopotamia into almost an island, as they are joined together at the Shatt al-Arab in the Basra Governorate of Iraq, and their sources in eastern Turkey are in close proximity.

The region extends south from the mountains of Anatolia, east from the hills on the left bank of the Euphrates river, west from the mountains on the right bank of the Tigris river and includes the Sinjar plain. It extends down the Tigris to Samarra and down the Euphrates to Hit, Iraq.

The major settlements are Mosul, Deir ez-Zor, Raqqa, al-Hasakah, Diyarbakır and Qamishli. The western, Syrian part, is essentially contiguous with the Syrian al-Hasakah Governorate and is described as "Syria's breadbasket". The eastern, Iraqi part, includes and extends slightly beyond the Iraqi Nineveh Governorate. In the north it includes the Turkish provinces of Şanlıurfa, Mardin, and parts of Diyarbakır Province.
Regions of Iraq

Geography

The name al-Jazira has been used since the 7th century AD by Islamic sources to refer to the northern section of Mesopotamia, while the Lower Mesopotamia, also known as Sawād, is the southern part of Mesopotamia. The name means "island", and at one time referred to the land between the two rivers, which in Syriac is Beth Nahrain (ܒܝܬ ܢܗܪ̈ܝܢ). Historically, the name could be restricted to the Sinjar plain coming down from the Sinjar Mountains, or expanded to embrace the entire plateau east of the coastal ranges. In pre-Abbasid times the western and eastern boundaries seem to have fluctuated, sometimes including what is now northern Syria to the west and Adiabene in the east.

Al-Jazira is characterised as an outwash or alluvial plain, quite distinct from the Syrian Desert and lower-lying central Mesopotamia; however, the area includes eroded hills and incised streams. The region has several parts to it. In the northwest is one of the largest salt flats in the world, Sabkhat al-Jabbul. Further south, extending from Mosul to near Basra is a sandy desert not unlike the Empty Quarter. In the late 20th and early 21st centuries the region has been plagued by drought.

History

Prehistory

Al-Jazirah is extremely important archeologically. This is the area where the earliest signs of agriculture and domestication of animals have been found, and thus the starting point leading to civilization and the modern world. Al-Jazirah includes the mountain Karaca Dağ in southern Turkey, where the closest relative to modern wheat still grows wild. At several sites (e.g. Hallan Çemi, Abu Hureyra, Mureybet) we can see a continuous occupation from a hunter-gathering lifestyle (based on hunting, and gathering and grinding of wild grains) to an economy based mainly on growing (still wild varieties of) wheat, barley and legumes from around 9000 BC (see PPNA). Domestication of goats and sheep followed within a few generations, but didn't become widespread for more than a millennium (see PPNB). Weaving and pottery followed about two thousand years later.

From Al-Jazirah the idea of farming along with the domesticated seeds spread first to the rest of the Levant and then to North-Africa, Europe and eastwards through Mesopotamia all the way to present-day Pakistan (see Mehrgarh).

Earlier archeologists worked on the assumption that agriculture was a prerequisite to a sedentary lifestyle, but excavations in Israel and Lebanon surprised science by showing that a sedentary lifestyle actually came before agriculture (see the Natufian culture). Further surprises followed in the 1990s with the spectacular finds of the megalithic structures at Göbekli Tepe in south-eastern Turkey. The earliest of these apparently ritual buildings are from before 9000 BC—over five thousand years older than Stonehenge—and thus the absolute oldest known megalithic structures anywhere. As far as we know today no well-established farming societies existed at the time. Farming seemed to be still experimental and only a smallish supplement to continued hunting and gathering. So either were (semi)sedentary hunter-gatherers rich enough and many enough to organize and execute such large communal building projects, or well-established agricultural societies existed much further back than hitherto known. After all, Göbekli Tepe lies just 32 km from Karaca Dağ.

The questions raised by Göbekli Tepe have led to intense and creative discussions among archeologists of the Middle East. Excavations at Göbekli Tepe continues, only about 5 percent has been revealed so far. Sumerians are theorized to have evolved from the Samarra culture of northern Mesopotamia.

Early history

The Uruk period (c. 4000 to 3100 BC) existed from the protohistoric Chalcolithic to Early Bronze Age period in Mesopotamia, including a section of the upper region.

Upper Mesopotamia is also the heartland of ancient Assyria, founded circa the 25th century BC. From the late 24th Century BC it was part of the Akkadian Empire, then is separated into three eras: Old Assyrian Empire (circa 2050–1750 BC), Middle Assyrian Empire (1365–1020 BC), Median Empire (678-549 BC) and Neo Assyrian Empire (911–605 BC).

The region fell to the Assyrians' southern brethren, the Babylonians in 605 BC, and from 539 BC it became part of the Achaemenid Empire; Achaemenid Assyria was known as Athura. From 323 BC, it was ruled by the Greek Seleucid Empire, the Greeks corrupting the name to Syria, which they also applied to Aram.

It then fell to the Parthians and Romans and was renamed Assyria by both. The area was still known as Asōristān under the Sasanian Empire until the Muslim conquest of Persia, when it was renamed al-Jazira.

Since pre-Arab and pre-Islamic times, al-Jazira has been an economically prosperous region with various agricultural (fruit and cereal) products, as well as a prolific manufacturing (food processing and cloth weaving) system. The region's position at the border of the Sasanian and Byzantine territories also made it an important commercial center, and advantage that the region continued to enjoy, even after the Muslim conquest of Persia and Byzantine possessions in the Levant.

Al-Jazira included the Roman/Byzantine provinces of Osroene and Mesopotamia, as well as the Parthian/Persian provinces of Asōristān, Arbayestan, Nisibis, and Mosul.

Islamic empires

The conquest of the region took place under the early Caliphate that left the general administration of the region intact, with the exception of levying the jizya tax on the population. At the time of Mu‘awiyah, governor of Syria and the later of the Umayyad Caliphate), the administration of al-Jazira was included in the administration of Syria. During the early Umayyad Caliphate, the administration of al-Jazira was often shared with that of Arminiya, a vast province encompassing most of Transcaucasia, Eastern Anatolia and what is now Iranian Azerbaijan.

The prosperity of the region and its high agricultural and manufacturing output made it an object of contest between the leaders of the early conquering Arab armies. Various conquerors tried, in vain, to bind various cities of the former Sassanian provinces, as well as the newly conquered Byzantine provinces of Mesopotamia, into a coherent unit under their own rule.

The control of the region, however, was essential to any power centered in Baghdad. Consequently, the establishment of the Abbasid Caliphate brought al-Jazira under the direct rule of the government in Baghdad. At this time, al-Jazira was one of the highest tax-yielding provinces of the Abbasid Empire.

During the early history of Islam, al-Jazira became a center for the Kharijite movement and had to be constantly subdued by various caliphs. In the 920s, the local Hamdanid dynasty established an autonomous state with two branches in al-Jazira (under Nasir al-Dawla) and Northern Syria (under Sayf al-Dawla). The demise of the Hamdanid power put the region back under the nominal rule of the Caliphs of Baghdad, while actual control was in the hands of the Buyid brothers who had conquered Baghdad itself. At the turn of the 11th century, the area came under the rule of a number of local dynasties, the Numayrids, the Mirdasids, and the Uqaylids, who persisted until the conquest by the Seljuq Empire.

With the arrival of the First Crusade, the western part came into Crusader hands as the County of Edessa, while the rest was ruled by a succession of semi-independent Turkish rulers until taken over by the Zengids, and eventually the Kurdish Ayyubids. Thereafter the northern and eastern portions were ruled initially by the Artuqids, laterly by the Kara Koyunlu and Akkoyunlu Turcomans and finally by the Safavids; while the western parts came under the Mamluk Sultanate of Egypt until the Ottoman–Mamluk War (1516–17), when it was taken by the Ottoman Empire. Remainder of this region was in Ottoman hands after Battle of Chaldiran and Ottoman–Safavid War (1532–1555).

Modern history

Although the region is ethnically diverse, it is considered to be the traditional Assyrian homeland in addition to Aramaic-speaking Christian descendants of the ancient Mesopotamians. Demographics saw huge shifts during the first half of the 20th century. Thousands of Assyrian refugees entered into Syrian Jazira province from Turkey following the Assyrian genocide of World War I. Additionally, in 1933 a further 24,000 Assyrian Christians fled into the area, following the Simele massacre in the Mosul region of northern Iraq.

Violence against Christians changed the demographics of Upper Mesopotamia. Some Kurdish and Persian tribes cooperated with Ottoman authorities in the Armenian and Assyrian genocides. In the middle of the 19th century, and due to the wars between the Kurdish Buhti amirs and the Turks, many Christians in the Siirt area were killed by the Kurds.

In Syria's Jazira province, the French official reports show the existence of 45 Kurdish villages in Jazira prior to 1927. After the failed Kurdish rebellions in Kemalist Turkey in the mid 1920s, there was a large influx of Kurds to Syrian Jazira province, that fell under the occupation of French Mandate authorities to escape the subsequent Turkish onslaught. It is estimated that 25,000 Kurds fled at this time to northern Syria, under French Mandate authorities, who encouraged their immigration, and granted them Syrian citizenship. A new wave of refugees arrived in 1929. The mandatory authorities continued to encourage Kurdish immigration into Syria, and by 1939, the villages numbered between 700 and 800. Sperl's estimation also contradicts the estimates of the French geographers Fevret and Gibert, who estimated that in 1953 out of the total 146,000 inhabitants of Jazira, agriculturalist Kurds made up 60,000 (41%), nomad Arabs 50,000 (34%), and a quarter of the population were Christians. Another account by Sir John Hope Simpson estimated the number of Kurds in Jazira province at 20,000 out of 100,000 people at the end of 1930.

Under the French Mandate of Syria, newly-arriving Kurds were granted citizenship by French Mandate authorities and enjoyed considerable rights as the French Mandate authority encouraged minority autonomy as part of a divide and rule strategy and recruited heavily from the Kurds and other minority groups, such as Alawite and Druze, for its local armed forces.

Assyrian Christians began to emigrate from Syria after the Amuda massacre of August 9, 1937. This massacre, carried out by the Kurd Saeed Agha, emptied the city of its Assyrian population. In 1941, the Assyrian community of al-Malikiyah were subjected to a vicious assault. Even though the assault failed, the Assyrians were terrorized and left in large numbers, and the immigration of Kurds from Turkey to the area have converted al-Malikiya, al-Darbasiyah and Amuda to completely Kurdish cities. The historically-important Christian city of Nusaybin had a similar fate after its Christian population left when it was annexed to Turkey. The Christian population of the city crossed the border into Syria and settled in Qamishli, which was separated by the railway (new border) from Nusaybin. Nusaybin became Kurdish and Qamishli became an Assyrian city. Things soon changed, however, with the immigration of Kurds beginning in 1926 following the failure of the rebellion of Saeed Ali Naqshbandi against the Turkish authorities.

Religious status
Djezirah is one of the four dioceses of the Syriac Orthodox Church. The others are in Aleppo, Homs–Hama and Damascus.

See also

 Assyrian homeland
 Beth Nahrain
 Fertile Crescent
 Geography of Iraq

Notes

Bibliography

 Moore, Andrew M. T.; Hillman, Gordon C.; Legge, Anthony J. (2000). Village on the Euphrates: From Foraging to Farming at Abu Hureyra. Oxford: Oxford University Press. .
 Peter M. M. G. Akkermans; Glenn M. Schwartz (2003). The archaeology of Syria: from complex hunter-gatherers to early urban societies (c. 16,000–300 BC). Cambridge University Press. pp. 72–. . Retrieved 27 June 2011.
 Istakhri, Ibrahim. Al-Masālik wa-al-mamālik, Dār al-Qalam, Cairo, 1961
 Brauer, Ralph W., Boundaries and Frontiers in Medieval Muslim Geography, Philadelphia, 1995
 Ibn Khurradādhbih. Almasalik wal Mamalik, E. J. Brill, Leiden, 1967
 
 Mohammadi Malayeri, Mohammad. Tārikh o Farhang-i Irān dar Asr-e Enteghaal, Tus, Tehran, 1996
 Morony, Michael G. Iraq after the Muslim Conquest, Princeton, 1984

 

Near East
Plains of Iraq
Plains of Syria
Plains of Turkey
Iraq–Syria border
Iraq–Turkey border
Syria–Turkey border
Historical regions